Panakkattodil Devi Temple is a Hindu temple in Chavara Thekkumbhagom village in Kollam district of the Indian state of Kerala. Primary deity of this temple is Durga. The temple is managed by the Travancore Devaswom Board, Kerala. The Thalappoli in 'Meda Bharani' and the annual festival during the months of April and May are popular.

History
Panakkattodil devi temple is an ancient and famous Hindu devi temple in South Kerala, located in Chavara Thekkumbhagom in Kollam District. There is no historical evidence available for the origin of this temple. But believe it as 1000 years old. Once a rover Brahmin youngster reached at Chavara Thekkumbhagom. He met a skilled carpenter called 'Koyippurathu Nambeesan Aasari'. They planned to build a temple in Chavara Thekkumbhagom. Nambeesan Aasari built base structure of the temple, then the Brahmin youngster evoke 'Bhadrakali' to this temple and adored. After that various parts of the temples had built and numerous devotees reach to  the temple. Temple built in Valayaappallil Family' property. According to some records, temple build under the supervision of 'Manjippuzha Thamburan'. In 1946 (Malayalam Era or Kollavarsham 1121) temple undertaken by Travancore Government.

Location and transport

Air 
Trivandrum International airport (92 km) is the nearest airport.

Rail 
Nearest and main railway station is Kollam railway station (18 km). Kollam railway station is well-connected by regular trains with Thiruvananthapuram and some major places in India. Another nearby station is Karunagappally railway station (21 km).

Roads 
Chavara Thekkumbhagom is well connected to other parts of Kerala through roads.
The main roads in the Panchayath meet National Highway 66 at Vettuthara Jn. in Neendakara Panchayath, Kuttivattom Junction in Karunagappally Municipality, Kottamkulangara Junction in Chavara Panchayath. There is a KSRTC bus station in the temple complex. Buses ply from the nearest bus depot in Kollam (15 km) and Karunagappally (19 km). Transport is provided by the Kerala State Road Transport Corporation and private transport bus operators from Thekkumbhagom to Karunagappally via Pavumba bridge and Karunagappally to Kollam via Thekkumbhagom and Pallikkodi-Dalavapuram bridge (Inaugurated in 2007). The first trip starts at 5.00 AM to Kayamkulam and the last trip at 9.50 PM from Karunagappally to Thekkumbhagom. Road transport is also supported by private taxis and autorickshaws

Water
The State water Transport Department operates boat services from Kollam to West Kallada, Muthirapparambu, Munroe Island and Alappuzha. The main boat jetty near the temple is Pallikkodi.

See also
Chavara Thekkumbhagom
Kollam

External links
http://sripanakkattodil.com
http://www.panackattodiltemple.blogspot.in
http://www.panakkattodiltemple.blogspot.in
http://www.klm.kerala.gov.in
http://www.keralatourism.org

References

Hindu temples in Kollam district
Devi temples in Kerala